The Welborn 'Doc' Barton House, located at 202 S. Edwards St. in Ingalls, Kansas, was built in c.1880 and moved to its current location in 1896. It was listed on the National Register of Historic Places in 2010.

Oddly, it had eight exterior doors from its original five-room 850 square foot configuration.

References

Houses on the National Register of Historic Places in Kansas
Victorian architecture in Kansas
Houses completed in 1896
Gray County, Kansas